The Union Dutchwomen represented Union College in ECAC women's ice hockey during the 2016–17 NCAA Division I women's ice hockey season.

Recruiting

2016–17 Dutchwomen

2015-16 Schedule

|-
!colspan=12 style=""| Regular Season

References

Union
Union Dutchwomen ice hockey seasons